Sri Lanka first participated at the Olympic Games in 1948, and has sent a delegation to every Summer Olympic Games except for 1976 Games and has never participated in the Winter Olympic Games.

Sri Lankan athletes have won a total of two Olympic silver medals, both in athletics.

The National Olympic Committee of Sri Lanka was created in 1937 and recognized by the International Olympic Committee that same year. The nation was designated as Ceylon (country code "CEY") until 1972.

Parami Wasanthi Maristela won Sri Lanka's first ever Youth Olympics medal, a bronze in the girls' 2000 metre steeplechase athletics event at the 2018 Summer Youth Olympics.

Medal tables

Medals by Games

Medals by sport

List of medalists

See also
 List of flag bearers for Sri Lanka at the Olympics
 :Category:Olympic competitors for Sri Lanka
 All-time Olympic Games medal count
 Sri Lanka at the Paralympics

References

External links